Juan Demóstenes Arosemena Barreati (24 June 1879 in Panama City – 16 December 1939 in Penonomé, Coclé Province) was President of Panama from October 1, 1936 to December 16, 1939. He belonged to the National Liberal Party. His Vice-Presidents were the conservative Augusto Samuel Boyd and Ezequiel Fernández Jaén, the maximum leader and founder of the National Revolutionary Party (today Panameñista Party).  He died being President of the Republic of Panamá and was briefly succeeded by Ezequiel Fernández Jaén who was his second Vice-President while the first one, Augusto Samuel Boyd, left Washington where he was acting as Panamanian ambassador, came to Panamá.

Juan Demostenes Arosemena's Presidency dedicated most of his efforts to promote education and health.

His brother-in-law Alcibíades Arosemena later served as president from 1951 to 1952.

References

1879 births
1939 deaths
People from Panama City
Panamanian people of Spanish descent
National Liberal Party (Panama) politicians
Presidents of Panama
Agriculture ministers of Panama
Foreign Ministers of Panama
Public works ministers of Panama